Twin Islands, formerly known as the Ulloa Islands, are two small islands southeast of Cortes Island, between the eastern coast of Vancouver Island and the mainland of British Columbia, Canada and are part of the Discovery Islands. The north island is somewhat less rocky and more forested than the south island. They are located within Electoral Area B of the Strathcona Regional District.

Maximilian, Margrave of Baden of Baden-Baden, Germany purchased Twin Islands in the late 1950s as a summer retreat for his family.

On August 13, 1994, Queen Elizabeth II spent a few days on a private retreat at Twin Island while Prince Philip visited Yellowknife, Northwest Territories, Iqaluit and Rankin Inlet, Nunavut.

References

Islands of the Discovery Islands